Drumcondra is the name of several places:

 Drumcondra, Dublin, Ireland, a residential area on the Northside of Dublin
 Drumcondra railway station
 Drumcondra F.C., former football club
 Drumconrath, a village in County Meath, Ireland, alternatively known as Drumcondra
 Drumcondra, Victoria, Australia, a residential suburb of Geelong, overlooking Corio Bay